ISO 22000 is a Food safety management system which is outcome focused, providing requirements for any organization in the food industry with objective to help to improve overall performance in food safety. These standards are intended to ensure safety in the global food supply chain. The standards involve the overall guidelines for food safety management and also focuses on traceability in the feed and food chain.

Food safety
Food safety refers to all those hazards, whether chronic or acute, that may make food injurious to the health of the consumer.

ISO 22000 standard
ISO 22000 is the most popular voluntary food safety international standard in the food industry with 42,937 sites certified (as per the ISO Survey 2021). The ISO 22000 family are international voluntary consensus standards which align to Good Standardization Practices (GSP) and the World Trade Organization (WTO) Principles for the Development of International Standards. Defining the requirements for a Food Safety Management System (FSMS) and incorporating the following elements which as defined as FSMS principles:

 interactive communication
 system management
 prerequisite programs
 HACCP principles

Critical reviews of the above elements have been conducted by many scientists.  Communication along the food chain is essential to ensure that all relevant food safety hazards are identified and adequately controlled at each step within the food chain. This implies communication between organizations both upstream and downstream in the food chain. Communication with customers and suppliers about identified hazards and control measures will assist in clarifying customer and supplier requirements.

Recognition of the organization's role and position within the food chain is essential to ensure effective interactive communication throughout the chain in order to deliver safe food products to the consumer.

ISO 22000 and HACCP
ISO 22000 has two Plan-Do-Check-Act (PDCA) cycles which operate one inside the other, the first covering the management system, the second the operations (described in ISO 22000:2018, Clause 8), which simultaneously cover the HACCP principles. ISO 22000 references the Codex Alimentarius General Principles of Food Hygiene, CXC 1-1969 which includes HACCP principles and 12 HACCP application steps. The following table explains the relationship and alignment between ISO 22000 and the Codex Alimentarius General Principles of Food Hygiene, CXC 1-1969. The task, Validate the control measure(s) or combination(s) of control measures, also references Guidelines for the Validation of Food Safety Control Measures, CXG 69-2008 

A study explains the importance of ISO 22000 Food Safety Management System (FSMS), Critical Control Points Hazard Analysis (HACCP) and the Prerequisite Programs (PRPs) as the foundation of HACCP, in preventing foodborne outbreaks. In addition, another study for HACCP effectiveness between ISO 22000 certified and non-certified dairy companies identified that by implementing the HACCP Food Safety System (FSS) and by being ISO 22000 certified, the level of the achievement of the HACCP objectives is improved significantly.

ISO 22000 family of standards
ISO published additional standards that are related to ISO 22000. These standards are known as the ISO 22000 family of standards. At the present time, the following standards will make up the ISO 22000 family of standards:

 ISO 22000 – Food safety management systems – Requirements for any organization in the food chain.
 ISO 22001 – Guidelines on the application of ISO 9001:2000 for the food and drink industry (replaces: ISO 15161:2001 Withdrawn).
 ISO/TS 22002- Prerequisite programmes on food safety—Part 1: Food manufacturing; Part 2: Catering; Part 3: Farming; Part 4: Food packaging manufacturing; Part 5: Transport and storage; Part 6: Feed and animal food production
 ISO/TS 22003 – Food safety — Part 1: Requirements for bodies providing audit and certification of food safety management systems; Part 2: Requirements for bodies providing evaluation and certification of products, processes and services, including an audit of the food safety system
 ISO/TS 22004 – Food safety management systems – Guidance on the application of ISO 22000:2005.
 ISO 22005 – Traceability in the feed and food chain – General principles and basic requirements for system design and implementation.
 ISO 22006 – Quality management systems – Guidance on the application of ISO 9002:2000 for crop production.
ISO 22000 is also used as a basis for the Food Safety Systems Certification (FSSC) Scheme FSSC 22000. FSSC 22000 is a Global Food Safety Initiative (GFSI) approved scheme, also referred to as a certification programme owner (CPO). The differences between ISO 22000 and schemes with GFSI recognition are explained in a paper from ISO, International standards and private standards.

ISO 9001 vs ISO 22000
In comparison with a Quality Management System ISO 9001, the Food Safety Management System, initially a standard (ISO 22000:2005 version) that was a more procedural-orientated guidance than a principle based one. The 2018 revision (ISO 22000:2018) addressed this by including the ISO general management principles, in addition to the FSMS principles, which are also referred to as the Quality Management Principles:  

ISO general management principles
 customer focus
 leadership
 engagement of people
 process approach
 improvement
 evidence-based decision making
 relationship management

Apart from that, ISO 22000 is an industrial-specific risk management system for any type of food safety which includes farming, processing, manufacturing, catering, storage and distribution. ISO 22000 is designed using the ISO high level structure (HLS), also referred to as Annex SL, to be integrated with other ISO Management System Standards (MSS) including the Quality Management System of ISO 9001. For conformity assessment and auditing, both ISO 9001 and ISO 22000 refer to ISO 17021 Conformity assessment, Requirements for bodies providing audit and certification of management systems and ISO 19011 Guidelines for auditing management systems. The detailed similarities, differences and combined effects of the two standards (ISO 9001, ISO 22000) can be found elsewhere.

Potential justification 
ISO Management System Standards (MSS) are designed to be integrated for any sector or industry and size, this is further explained in ISO and Small & Medium Enterprises.  In 2004, the European Office of Crafts, Trades and Small and Medium sized Enterprises for Standardisation noted that the standard is only suitable for large sized companies and small food businesses will not be able to seek such a high standard due to the lack of resources to pursue the certification. The agency suggested creating an alternative for small food businesses to achieve the same objective.
EFSA is now making their efforts on the food legislations that are adaptable for the SMEs in food supply chains.  In addition, ISO and United Nations Industrial Development Organization (UNIDO) jointly published ISO 22000 a practical guide which provides guidance to assist all organizations (including small and medium-sized) that recognize the potential benefits of implementing a FSMS in accordance with ISO 22000. 

Food organizations which seek the standard certification are evolving towards integrated management systems, typically integrating Environmental (ISO 14001) and Occupational Health & Safety (ISO 45001) along with Quality (ISO 9001). This takes a process approach and risk-based thinking into consideration where risks are addressed at both organizational and operational levels which include food safety, worker safety and environmental and are from the primary production in the supply chains and the later stages of food processing. , 

ISO 22000 is well positioned for future growth due to the ISO 2030 Strategy around inclusiveness and the World Health Organization food safety strategy which explains governments should use international standards and guidelines to the greatest extent. This is supported by the World Trade Organization and Food and Agriculture Organization joint publication which explains the WTO Agreements strongly encourage governments to harmonize their requirements on the basis of international standards.

History

See also 
 Annex SL
 Codex Alimentarius
 Foodborne illness 
 Food engineering
 Food packaging 
 Food safety
 Food system
 Global Food Safety Initiative
 International Organization for Standardization
 International Standard
 ISO 9000
 List of ISO standards
 Management system
 PDCA
 Process manufacturing
 Standardization
 Technical standard

References

Further reading
Surak, John G. "A Recipe for Safe Food: ISO 22000 and HACCP". Quality Progress. October 2007. pp. 21–27.
McKinley, Kevin;Chambers, Albert Overview of the ISO 22000 Family of Standards, Joint UNCTAD/WTO Informal Information Session, 25 June 2007
Ghizzoni,L; Surak,J;  An introduction to ISO 22000 - food safety management systems, International Trade Centre, BULLETIN No. 85/2008

External links 
 Food Safety Handbook A Practical Guide for Building a Robust Food Safety Management System – International Finance Corporation
 ISO 22000 Food safety management systems — Requirements for any organization in the food chain 
 ISO and Agriculture
 ISO and Food
 ISO Policy - Examples by Sector - Food Products

22000
Food safety